Eubria is a genus of beetles belonging to the family Psephenidae.

Species:
 Eubria palustris

References

Byrrhoidea